Puro Sentimiento is a 2004 studio album by Colombian singer Charlie Zaa. On this album, Zaa had a chance to sing with his father Luis Humberto Sanchez on "Soñar y Nada Mas".

Track listing
  Llora Corazón
  Fatalidad - Perdón Por Adorarte
  Senderito de Amor
  Ni Me Llaman Ni Me Escriben
  Navidad
  Traicionera - Pesares
  Lamparilla
  Como Una Sombra
  Pobre Novia - En Ese Mas Allá
  Soñar y Nada Mas

Charts

References

External links
 http://www.encyclopedia.com/education/news-wires-white-papers-and-books/zaa-charlie

2004 albums
Albums by Colombian artists
Bolero albums